Lake County High School is the name of multiple educational institutions.

Lake County High School (Leadville, Colorado)
Lake County High School (Tiptonville, Tennessee)